Key Pittman (1872–1940) was a U.S. Senator from Nevada from 1913 to 1940. Senator Pittman may also refer to:

Anastasia Pittman (born 1970), Oklahoma State Senate
Charles Pittman (politician), Mississippi State Senate
Edwin L. Pittman (born 1935), Mississippi State Senate
Trip Pittman (born 1960), Alabama State Senate
Vail M. Pittman (1880–1964),  Nevada State Senate

See also
Robert Carter Pitman (1825–1891), Massachusetts State Senate